The Henninger Farm Covered Bridge, also known as Dauphin County Bridge No. 43, is a historic covered bridge spanning Wiconisco Creek in Washington Township, Dauphin County, Pennsylvania. It was built about 1850, and is a single-span bridge with an overall length of 72 feet. The deck has a width of 16 feet and the clearance is 11 feet. The trussing system is a combination of Burr and Double-arch truss.  It is the only remaining covered bridge located wholly in Dauphin County.

It was added to the National Register of Historic Places in 1978.

References

Covered bridges on the National Register of Historic Places in Pennsylvania
Covered bridges in Dauphin County, Pennsylvania
Bridges in Dauphin County, Pennsylvania
National Register of Historic Places in Dauphin County, Pennsylvania
Road bridges on the National Register of Historic Places in Pennsylvania
Wooden bridges in Pennsylvania
Burr Truss bridges in the United States